Tactusa discrepans is a moth of the family Erebidae first described by Michael Fibiger in 2010. It is known from northern Thailand and the Chinese provinces of Yunnan and Guizhou.

Adults have been recorded in April, July and October.

The wingspan is 9.5–12 mm. There is a very large triangular, black patch on the forewing, including the fringes, that extends from the antemedial point on the costa to the apex and to the tornal edge. There are a few light-brown patches present within the large patch. Parts of the postmedial and subterminal lines are present, they are light brown. The terminal lines are indicated by blackish-brown interneural spots. Parts of the fringes are basally light brown, together forming a line. The hindwing is dark grey, with an indistinct discal spot and the underside is unicolorous grey.

Subspecies
Tactusa discrepans discrepans (northern Thailand)
Tactusa discrepans yunnanensis Fibiger, 2011 (Yunnan and Guizhou)

References

Micronoctuini
Taxa named by Michael Fibiger
Moths described in 2010